Magnolia Ranch, near Winfield, Kansas dates from 1883.  A  portion of the ranch was listed on the National Register of Historic Places in 1973 with six contributing buildings.

It has also been known as Chesbro Ranch.  The ranch house is a two-and-a-half-story  stone house with early Renaissance styling.

References

Agricultural buildings and structures on the National Register of Historic Places in Kansas
Renaissance Revival architecture in Kansas
Buildings and structures completed in 1883
Cowley County, Kansas